The 1997 Copa del Rey Final was the 95th final of the Spanish cup competition, the Copa del Rey. The final was played at Santiago Bernabéu Stadium in Madrid on 28 June 1997. The match was won by Barcelona, who beat Real Betis 3–2.

Details

1997
1
FC Barcelona matches
Real Betis matches